Kozarac is a village in Croatia. Administratively, it is located in the Čeminac municipality within the Osijek-Baranja County. Population is 789 people.

References

Populated places in Osijek-Baranja County
Baranya (region)